Joseph Desanat (1796-1873) was a French Provençal poet and journal editor.

Early life
Joseph Desanat was born in 1796 in Tarascon.

Career
Desanat was first a courtier. He then moved to Marseille, where he made charcuterie.

In 1841, Desanat founded Lou Bouil-Abaïsso, a literary journal of Provençal poetry published in Marseille. The journal ran from 1841 to 1842, and from 1844 to 1846. Desanat encouraged his friend Jean-Baptiste Gaut to submit poems, leading to a career as a poet and an advocacy of the Félibrige movement.

A prolific Provençal poet himself, Desanat's use of the language is remarkable as it predates Frédéric Mistral's spelling rules.

Death
He died in 1873.

Legacy
The Boulevard Joseph Desanat in Tarascon was named in his honour.

References

1796 births
1873 deaths
People from Tarascon
French male poets
19th-century French poets